The hidden linear function problem, is a search problem that generalizes the Bernstein–Vazirani problem. In the Bernstein–Vazirani problem, the hidden function is implicitly specified in an oracle; while in the 2D hidden linear function problem (2D HLF), the hidden function is explicitly specified by a matrix and a binary vector. 2D HLF can be solved exactly by a constant-depth quantum circuit restricted to a 2-dimensional grid of qubits using bounded fan-in gates but can't be solved by any sub-exponential size, constant-depth classical circuit using unbounded fan-in AND, OR, and NOT gates.

2D HLF problem statement 

define a function :

  

and

 

There exists a  such that

 

Find .

2D HLF algorithm 
With 3 registers; the first holding , the second containing  and the third carrying an -qubit state, the circuit has controlled gates which implement 
 from the first two registers to the third.

This problem can be solved by a quantum circuit, where H is the Hadamard gate, S is the  S gate and CZ is  CZ gate.

References

External links 
 Implementation of the hidden linear function problem

Quantum algorithms
Quantum complexity theory 
Computational complexity theory